In molecular biology, group III pyridoxal-dependent decarboxylases are a family of bacterial enzymes comprising ornithine decarboxylase , lysine decarboxylase  and arginine decarboxylase .

Pyridoxal-5'-phosphate-dependent amino acid decarboxylases can be divided into four groups based on amino acid sequence. Group III comprises prokaryotic ornithine and lysine decarboxylase and the prokaryotic biodegradative type of arginine decarboxylase.

Structure
These enzymes consist of several conserved domains. 
The N-terminal domain has a flavodoxin-like fold, and is termed the "wing" domain because of its position in the overall 3D structure. Ornithine decarboxylase from Lactobacillus 30a (L30a OrnDC) is representative of the large, pyridoxal-5'-phosphate-dependent decarboxylases that act on lysine, arginine or ornithine. The crystal structure of the L30a OrnDC has been solved to 3.0 A resolution. Six dimers related by C6 symmetry compose the enzymatically active dodecamer (approximately 106 Da). Each monomer of L30a OrnDC can be described in terms of five sequential folding domains. The amino-terminal domain, residues 1 to 107, consists of a five-stranded beta-sheet termed the "wing" domain. Two wing domains of each dimer project inward towards the centre of the dodecamer and contribute to dodecamer stabilisation.
The major domain contains a conserved lysine residue, which is the site of attachment of the pyridoxal-phosphate group.

See also
Group I pyridoxal-dependent decarboxylases
Group II pyridoxal-dependent decarboxylases
Group IV pyridoxal-dependent decarboxylases

References

Protein domains